Joshua Daniel Mauro (born February 17, 1991) is an English-born American football defensive end who is a free agent. He played college football at Stanford. Mauro has also played for the New York Giants and Jacksonville Jaguars.

Early years
Mauro moved from England to Texas when he was 3. His father, Greg, had been stationed for work in England.
He was named to the Dallas Morning News first-team all-area and Associated Press all-state team in high school. He was ranked as the nation’s 31st-best prospect weakside defensive end by Rivals.com.

College career
On October 9, 2013, he was named on the Bednarik Award watch list. On November 18, 2013, he was named on the Ted Hendricks Award midseason watch list. On December 2, 2013, he was an honorable mention for the 2013 All-Pac-12 team.

Professional career

Pittsburgh Steelers
Mauro began his professional career by signing with the Pittsburgh Steelers as an undrafted free agent, but was released during the final roster cuts.

Arizona Cardinals
After his release from the Steelers, Mauro signed with the Arizona Cardinals. During his rookie season in 2014, Mauro played 5 games with 6 tackles and a pass defended. In 2015, he played 14 games with 15 tackles, 1 sack, 1 pass defended, 2 forced fumbles, and 1 fumble recovery.

In 2016, Mauro started 13 of 15 games he played in recording a career-high 42 tackles and 13 tackles for loss. Set to be a restricted free agent in 2017, Mauro signed a two-year contract to remain with the Cardinals on January 12, 2017.

On March 16, 2018, Mauro was released by the Cardinals.

New York Giants
On March 19, 2018, Mauro signed with the New York Giants reuniting with his former defensive coordinator in Arizona, James Bettcher.

On March 23, 2018, Mauro was suspended without pay for the first four games of the 2018 regular season for violating the NFL policy on performance enhancing substances.

After being reinstated from his suspension, he recorded a tackle in the Giant's Week 5 loss to the Carolina Panthers.  After the bye week and the trading of Damon Harrison, he was named the starting defensive end next to defensive tackle B. J. Hill and nose tackle Dalvin Tomlinson. In his first game as a starter for the Giants, a win against the San Francisco 49ers, he recorded 5 tackles.  In a Week 11 win against the Tampa Bay Buccaneers, he recorded 4 tackles. Mauro would remain the starting 5-tech defensive end for the rest of the 2018 season and finished with 28 total tackles (17 solo and 11 assists), 1 sack, 4 tackles for a loss, and 1 QB hit.

Oakland / Las Vegas Raiders
On March 15, 2019, Mauro signed with the Oakland Raiders. He was released on September 1, 2019, but was re-signed a day later.

Jacksonville Jaguars
Mauro signed with the Jacksonville Jaguars on August 12, 2020. The NFL suspended him for the first five games of the 2020 NFL season for violating the league's performance-enhancing drugs policy on August 21, 2020. He was reinstated from suspension on October 12, and he was placed on the reserve/COVID-19 list by the team on October 17. He was activated from the list on October 22 and subsequently released by the Jaguars. He was re-signed to the practice squad two days later.

Arizona Cardinals (second stint)
On October 28, 2020, Mauro was signed by the Arizona Cardinals off the Jaguars practice squad. Mauro made his debut with the Cardinals in Week 9 against the Miami Dolphins. During the game, Mauro recorded his first sack of the season on Tua Tagovailoa during the 34–31 loss. He was placed on injured reserve on November 28, 2020. He was designated to return from injured reserve on December 16, and began practicing with the team again, but was waived on January 13, 2021.

On August 10, 2021, Mauro re-signed with the Cardinals. He was released on August 31, 2021. He was re-signed to the practice squad on October 19.

References

External links
Stanford bio

1991 births
Living people
People from Hurst, Texas
Sportspeople from St Albans
American football defensive ends
Stanford Cardinal football players
Pittsburgh Steelers players
Arizona Cardinals players
New York Giants players
Oakland Raiders players
 English
English players of American football
Jacksonville Jaguars players
Players of American football from Texas